Eric Frederick D'Ath  (25 March 1897 – 18 June 1979) was a New Zealand pathologist, and was professor of pathology and medical jurisprudence at the University of Otago from 1929 until 1962.

In the 1965 Queen's Birthday Honours, D'Ath was appointed a Commander of the Order of the British Empire, in recognition of his services as professor of pathology and medical jurisprudence at the University of Otago. In 1975, he was conferred an honorary Doctor of Science degree by the University of Otago.

References

1897 births
1979 deaths
People from Patea
University of Otago alumni
Academic staff of the University of Otago
New Zealand pathologists
New Zealand Commanders of the Order of the British Empire